Thugged Out: The Albulation is the debut solo studio album by American rapper Yukmouth. It was released as double album on February 23, 1998 via Rap-A-Lot Records. Recording sessions took place at Enterprise Studio in Burbank) and at the Hippie House in Houston. Production was handled by Mike Dean, Mr. Lee, Don Juan, Tone Capone and Keith "88 Keys" Kinlow, with J. Prince serving as executive producer. It features guest appearances from his The Regime groupmates Phats Bossilini, Tech N9ne, Madd Maxx and Poppa LQ, a former Luniz partner Numskull, West Coast hip hop acts MC Ren, Outlawz and Tha Dogg Pound, several labelmates from Rap-A-Lot roster, such as the 5th Ward Boyz, DMG, Do or Die, Scarface and Willie D, as well as Fa Sho, Big Lurch, Tela and Val Young among others. The album peaked at number 40 on the Billboard 200 and at number 8 on the Billboard Top R&B/Hip-Hop Albums in the United States.

Along with a 2Pac-dedicated promotional single, a music video was released for the song "Still Ballin'". The video, featuring cameo appearances by the Outlawz, Tech N9ne and Shock G, was produced by Fifth Gear Ent. and directed by Eeinna Brighton-Akers, the first female director out of Hype Williams' Big Dog Films. The track "It's In My Blood Part II" is a sequel song to "In My Blood" performed by DMG, Yukmouth and Big Mike off of Scarface's My Homies, which was released seven months before this album.

Track listing

Personnel

Jerold "Yukmouth" Ellis – main artist
Mutah Napoleon" Beale – featured artist (tracks: 2, 12)
Rufus "Young Noble" Cooper III – featured artist (tracks: 2, 12)
Malcolm "E.D.I." Greenridge – featured artist (tracks: 2, 12)
Aaron "Tech N9ne" Yates – featured artist (tracks: 4, 6, 27)
Keith "Madd Maxx" Walker – featured artist (track 4)
Late "Phats Bossi" Bankoudagba – featured artist (tracks: 4, 14, 15, 19)
Kenneth "Poppa LQ" Green – featured artist (track 4)
Harold "DMG" Armstrong – featured artist (tracks: 5, 11, 24)
Gary Paul "G Mone" Talley – featured artist (track 5)
Lorenzo "MC Ren" Patterson – featured artist (track 6)
Andre "007" Barnes – featured artist (tracks: 10, 24)
Eric "E-Rock" Taylor – featured artist (tracks: 10, 24)
Richard "Lo Life" Nash – featured artist (tracks: 10, 24)
C. Phillips – featured artist (tracks: 10, 15, 17, 23)
B. Phillips – featured artist (tracks: 10, 15, 17, 23)
Antron "Big Lurch" Singleton – featured artist (track 15)
Garrick "Numskull" Husbands – featured artist (tracks: 16, 18)
Katari "Kastro" Cox – featured artist (track 16)
Delmar "Daz Dillinger" Arnaud – featured artist (track 18)
Ricardo "Kurupt" Brown – featured artist (track 18)
Winston "Tela" Rogers III – featured artist (track 20)
Kira – featured artist (track 20)
Anthony "N.A.R.D" Round – featured artist (track 21)
Darnell "Belo Zero" Smith – featured artist (track 21)
Dennis "AK47" Round – featured artist (track 21)
Val Young – featured artist (track 23)
James "J. Prince" Smith – featured artist (track 24), executive producer
Brad "Scarface" Jordan – featured artist (track 24)
William "Willie D" Dennis – featured artist (track 24)
T. Jupiter – featured artist (track 24)
T. Edwards – featured artist (track 24)
Jean Dorcy – featured artist (track 24)
Dante Miller – featured artist (track 24)
Iren "2-4" Moore – featured artist (track 24)
Charles "Chilla" Paxton – featured artist (track 24)
Kuirshan – featured artist (track 25)
Anthony "Tone Capone" Gilmour – producer (tracks: 1, 3, 13, 23)
Leroy "Mr. Lee" Williams – producer (tracks: 2, 7, 15, 17-19, 21, 25, 28), engineering
Michael "Mike" Dean – producer (tracks: 3, 4, 9-13, 16, 18, 20, 22-24, 27, 28), engineering, mixing, mastering
D. "Don Juan" Cayson – producer (tracks: 5, 6, 14, 26)
Keith "88 Keys" Kinlow – producer (track 24)
Micah Harrison – engineering
Anzel "Red Boy" Jennings – production coordinator
Mario "Rico" Allen – production coordinator
Tony "Big Chief" Randle – production supervisor
Artwerkz – layout design
Pen & Pixel – photography design

Charts

References

External links

Yukmouth albums
1998 debut albums
Rap-A-Lot Records albums
Albums produced by Mike Dean (record producer)